The Flipside film festival is an international film festival held in Plymouth, England, which focuses on independent and experimental film practice. It is put on by Flipside, a collective which explores participatory modes of film-making and alternatives to the industrial technical obsolescence model. It takes its inspiration and central research methodology from the DIY punk subculture.

History
The first Flipside Film Festival was conceived and curated by filmmaker Dan Paolantonio in 2008. It ran from 21–31 May 2008, in Plymouth and showcased both feature length and short films. The event featured an open call for film submissions, an "Official Selection" screening, and various thematically relevant film workshops.

The 2008 Official Selection program included:
Tony Hill: A Retrospective (Including Laws of Nature/Downside Up/History of the Wheel) (UK)
Super-8 Cities by Nathan Coombs (UK)
Our Sufferings in This Land by Ed Hill (UK/Palestine)
She's A Punk Rocker: UK by Zillah Minx (UK)
There is No Authority but Yourself by Alexander Oey (NL)
Confusions of an Unmarried Couple by Jason and Brett Butler (CAN)
ALF: Behind the Mask by Shannon Keith (USA)
The Dead Brothers: Death is Not the End and Zownir: Radical Man by M.A. Littler (GER)
Dancehall Queen and Westway to the World by Don Letts (UK)

Related events
In 2010, the Flipside collective produced a series of microcinema events in the city of Plymouth conceived of by filmmaker Allister Gall. These events explored the potential of translating a DIY punk methodology to participatory microcinema film-making. Each event included an event-specific manifesto, interviews with invited guest speakers, film screenings and details of masterclasses and film training to support the production of films for each project.

References

Film festivals in England
Festivals in Devon
Plymouth, Devon